Glipa australiasis is a species of beetle in the genus Glipa. It was described in 1941.

References

australiasis
Beetles described in 1941